Acetate—[acyl-carrier protein] ligase (HS-acyl-carrier protein:acetate ligase, [acyl-carrier protein]:acetate ligase, MadH) is an enzyme with systematic name acetate:(acyl-carrier-protein) ligase (AMP-forming). This enzyme catalyses the following chemical reaction

 ATP + acetate + an [acyl-carrier protein]  AMP + diphosphate + an acetyl-[acyl-carrier protein]

This enzyme, from the anaerobic bacterium Malonomonas rubra, is a component of the multienzyme complex EC 4.1.1.89, biotin-dependent malonate decarboxylase.

References

External links 
 

EC 6.2.1